Kents Bank is a railway station on the Furness Line, which runs between  and . It is owned by Network Rail and managed by Northern Trains.

History
The station building was designed in 1865 by the Lancaster-based architects, Paley and Austin, for the Furness Railway. Though it remains, it is in private residential use.

Facilities
The station is unstaffed but now has ticket machines available, allowing passenger to buy before boarding. Shelters are located on each platform, along with digital information screens and a PA system. Access to the northbound platform is via a user-worked barrier level crossing, so whilst it has step-free access disabled travellers should exercise caution when crossing the line.

Services

A (mostly) hourly service runs each way on Sundays.

References

External links 

 
 

Railway stations in Cumbria
DfT Category F2 stations
Former Ulverston and Lancaster Railway stations
Railway stations in Great Britain opened in 1857
Railway stations in Great Britain closed in 1858
Railway stations in Great Britain opened in 1859
Northern franchise railway stations
1857 establishments in England
Grange-over-Sands